was a Japanese film actor. He appeared in more than twenty films from 1950 to 1959.  Takahashi died in a traffic accident.

Career
Born in Tokyo, Takahashi graduated from the Japanese Film School (Nihon Eiga Gakkō) and joined the Shochiku studio in 1945. He became one of the company's top young male stars, alongside Keiji Sada and Kōji Tsuruta.

Selected filmography

References

External links
 

1926 births
1959 deaths
Male actors from Tokyo
Japanese male film actors
20th-century Japanese male actors